John Baskcomb (7 February 1916 – 29 March 2000) was an English character actor who made numerous television and film appearances over a 35-year period.

He was the son of the founder of the Bank of England Operatic and Dramatic Society and was educated at Croydon High School for Boys. He then appeared on stage in repertory theatre in Croydon and Henley-on-Thames and in clubs, pantomimes and concert parties.

He made appearances in numerous British television plays and series including; The Forsyte Saga, Doctor Who (Terror of the Autons), The Saint, Softly, Softly and Poldark and he played the role of Cardinal Wolsey in The Six Wives of Henry VIII (1970). His film roles included Oliver! (uncredited), Chitty Chitty Bang Bang (uncredited), Battle of Britain, Dad's Army and Omen III: The Final Conflict.

Filmography
No Trees in the Street (1959) - Minor Role (uncredited)
Oliver! (1968) - Workhouse Governor (uncredited)
Chitty Chitty Bang Bang (1968) - Castle Chef (uncredited)
Battle of Britain (1969) - Farmer
Uncle Vanya (1970) - Telyeghin (Play of the Month)
Dad's Army (1971) - Mayor
Zeppelin (1971) - Henderson (uncredited)
I Want What I Want (1972)
The Darwin Adventure (1972) - Prof. Draper
The Stick Up (1977) - Spectator
Omen III: The Final Conflict (1981) - Diplomat

References

External links

1916 births
2000 deaths
English male film actors
English male television actors
People from Purley, London
20th-century English male actors
Male actors from Surrey